Letizia is a predominantly Italian feminine given name. People bearing the name Letizia include:
Queen Letizia of Spain (born 1972), wife of King Felipe VI
Letizia Battaglia (born 1935), Italian photographer and photojournalist
Letizia Bertoni (born 1937), Italian hurdler 
Letizia Camera (born 1992), Italian volleyball player
Letizia Ciampa (born 1986), Italian voice actress
Letizia Moratti (born 1949), Italian businesswoman and politician 
Letizia Nuzzo (born 1976), Italian former synchronized swimmer 
Letizia Paternoster (born 1999), Italian racing cyclist
Letizia Paoli (born 1966), Italian criminologist
Letizia Quaranta (1892–1977), Italian actress
Letizia Ramolino (1750–1836), Italian noble, mother of Napoleon I of France

References

Italian feminine given names